The fifth edition of the annual Four Hills Tournament in Germany and Austria was won by Pentti Uotinen. Another Finnish athlete, Eino Kirjonen placed second in the overall ranking for the third time. It was the first edition without the winner of the inaugural tournament, Sepp Bradl.

The defending champion, Nikolay Kamenskiy, won the event in Garmisch-Partenkirchen, but had already missed out on producing a competitive result at the first event in Oberstdorf.

Participating nations and athletes

Results

Oberstdorf
 Schattenbergschanze, Oberstdorf
29 December 1956

Toni Brutscher placed in the Top Ten in Oberstdorf in each of the first five Four Hills tournaments.

Innsbruck
 Bergiselschanze, Innsbruck
30 December 1956

Garmisch-Partenkirchen
 Große Olympiaschanze, Garmisch-Partenkirchen
01 January 1957

Bischofshofen
 Paul-Ausserleitner-Schanze, Bischofshofen
06 January 1957

After three events, Pentti Uotinen was still in the lead in the overall ranking. His closest pursuer was Max Bolkart, but the German only placed 11th in Bischofshofen (210.2p) and thus stayed behind the Finn. Eino Kirjonen on the other hand, who was fourth after the New Year's event, almost closed the gap by reducing the point difference from 22.3 to 1.5 points.

Final ranking

References

External links
 FIS website
 Four Hills Tournament web site

Four Hills Tournament
1956 in ski jumping
1957 in ski jumping